Capital punishment is a legal penalty in the U.S. state of Idaho.

Legal process 
When the prosecution seeks the death penalty, the sentence is decided by the jury and must be unanimous.

In case of a hung jury during the penalty phase of the trial, a life sentence is issued, even if a single juror opposed death (there is no retrial).

The power of clemency belongs to the Idaho Commission of Pardons and Parole.

Lethal injection is the only method of execution authorized by statutes.

Men on death row are incarcerated in Idaho Maximum Security Institution near Kuna, and women in Pocatello Women's Correctional Center.

Capital crimes
First-degree murder can be punished with death if it involves any of the following aggravating factors:
The defendant was previously convicted of another murder;
At the time the murder was committed, the defendant also committed another murder;
The defendant knowingly created a great risk of death to many persons;
The murder was committed for remuneration or the promise of remuneration, or the defendant employed another to commit the murder for remuneration or the promise of remuneration;
The murder was especially heinous, atrocious or cruel, manifesting exceptional depravity;
By the murder, or circumstances surrounding its commission, the defendant exhibited utter disregard for human life;
The murder was committed in the perpetration of, or attempt to perpetrate, arson, rape, robbery, burglary, kidnapping or mayhem and the defendant killed, intended to kill, or acted with reckless indifference to human life;
The murder was committed in the perpetration of, or attempt to perpetrate, lewd and lascivious conduct with a minor, sexual abuse of a child under 16 years of age, ritualized abuse of a child, sexual exploitation of a child, sexual battery of a minor child 16 or 17 years of age, or forcible sexual penetration by use of a foreign object, and the defendant killed, intended to kill, or acted with reckless indifference to human life;
The defendant, by his conduct, whether such conduct was before, during or after the commission of the murder at hand, has exhibited a propensity to commit murder which will probably constitute a continuing threat to society;
The murder was committed against a former or present peace officer, executive officer, officer of the court, judicial officer or prosecuting attorney because of the exercise of official duty or because of the victim's former or present official status;
The murder was committed against a witness or potential witness in a criminal or civil legal proceeding because of such proceeding.

Under Title 18, Chapter 45, Section 05 (4505) of the Idaho Statutes, the death penalty can also applied for kidnapping in the first-degree, provided that the kidnapping involved any of the following aggravating factors, though it is unenforceable under Kennedy v. Louisiana: 
The victim of the kidnapping was subjected by the kidnapper or those acting in concert with him to torture, maiming or the intentional infliction of grievous mental or physical injury; 
The defendant knowingly created a great risk of death to any person, including the kidnapped;
The kidnapping was committed for remuneration or the promise of remuneration or the defendant employed another to commit the kidnapping for remuneration or the promise of remuneration;
The kidnapping was especially heinous, atrocious or cruel, manifesting exceptional depravity; or
The kidnapping was committed for the purpose of murdering or maiming a witness or potential witness in a judicial proceeding.

Idaho statutes provides the death penalty for perjury causing execution of an innocent person as well. The death penalty can be applied in any case for perjury causing execution of an innocent person and no aggravated factors have to be proven in order for the death penalty to be given.

History and methods 
Idaho executed 14 men, all by hanging, before its admission to the Union in 1890. Another 12 men were executed, again by hanging, between that time and 1957. Idaho has never executed a woman. There were no executions between 1957 and 1972, when the United States Supreme Court decision Furman v. Georgia struck down all death penalty statutes across the United States and created an effective moratorium on executions.

Idaho passed new statutes on July 7, 1973, and the 1976 case Gregg v. Georgia lifted the moratorium. Hanging was the state's sole method of execution between that time and the 1978 adoption of lethal injection by the Idaho Legislature. The firing squad was added by the Legislature in 1982 as an alternative option to lethal injection. In 2009, the firing squad option was removed, Idaho having never executed an inmate by that method. This left lethal injection as the sole execution method.

In 1982, the Idaho Department of Corrections purchased a mobile home and converted it to serve as an execution chamber. This was used only once in 1994, for the execution of Keith Wells. In 2011, the state introduced a new permanent execution chamber, which it used for the execution of Paul Ezra Rhoades that year and Richard Albert Leavitt in 2012.

In 2023 a proposed bill was introduced to add firing squad as a method, with lawmakers citing difficulties in obtaining lethal injection drugs which has caused the postponement of executions.

See also
List of people executed in Idaho
List of death row inmates in Idaho
Crime in Idaho
Law of Idaho

References

External links 
 List of Idaho's pre-1972 executions
 former Idaho execution chamber photo (used only once, for Keith Wells)
 Current Idaho execution chamber photo 

 
Idaho
Idaho law